Hugo Mühlig (9 November 1854 - 16 February 1929) was a German Impressionist painter. From 1881, he lived in Düsseldorf as a painter of landscapes and genre scenes.

Life

Born in Dresden, Hugo Mühlig was the son of the landscape painter Meno Mühlig, and nephew of the landscape painter Bernhard Mühlig. He first studied painting with his father, then at the Dresden Academy of Fine Arts, most recently from 1877 to 1880 as master-student of Viktor Paul Mohn (1842-1911). While he remained faithful to the realism of the school of Ludwig Richter in his drawings, he soon began to explore new ways in painting. Although his paintings (usually of small or medium format) from the usual viewing distance are characterized by a great detail and perfect reproduction of material valeurs, the near vision shows that these effects are achieved with great virtuosity through the use of impressionistic painting techniques.

The impressionistic character of his paintings also comes from the fact that the landscapes and scenes of farmers, hunters, or walkers to the fairgrounds are almost always immersed in bright sunlight, which makes the colors of the objects particularly pure and unadulterated.

Since Hugo Mühlig was not an official academy painter, supported by public contracts but a freelance painter for the art market, many of his paintings are still in private ownership. His work is in the collections of the Neue Galerie Berlin, the Kunstmuseum Düsseldorf, the Neue Galerie Kassel and the Wallraf-Richartz-Museum in Cologne.

References
  Angelika Baeumerth, Wilhelm Körs: Hugo Mühlig (1854-1929). Leben und Werk. Düsseldorf 1997, 
 Hans Paffrath: Hugo Mühlig. 1854 Dresden - Düsseldorf 1929. Düsseldorf: Droste, 1993

External links

 

1854 births
1929 deaths
19th-century German painters
19th-century German male artists
German male painters
20th-century German painters
20th-century German male artists
German landscape painters
Impressionist painters